Magnus Stinnerbom is a fiddler from Värmland, Sweden, whose principal instrument is the viola.  He is the son of the influential fiddler Leif Stinnerbom, who co-founded the Nordic folk band Groupa. Magnus is currently playing with the groups Harv (with Daniel Sandén-Warg) and Hedningarna.  He has toured the U.S. and Europe with Finnish singer Sanna Kurki-Suonio, and he has also contributed to the record Nils Holgersson.

References 

Swedish fiddlers
Male violinists
Living people
Fiddlers from Sweden
21st-century violinists
21st-century Swedish male musicians
Year of birth missing (living people)